Kathleen Suzanne Phang (born August 1, 1975) is an American lawyer, political commentator, podcaster, and television host. She hosts The Katie Phang Show, which airs on the weekends on MSNBC and Thursdays to Fridays on Peacock.

Early life
Phang was born in Miami, Florida. Her father immigrated to the United States from South Korea at the age of 19. Phang graduated from Miami Palmetto Senior High School in Pinecrest, Florida. She earned a Bachelor of Arts in political science from Yale University and a Juris Doctor from the University of Miami's School of Law, graduating in 2000. She then worked for the state attorney's office in Miami-Dade County.

Career
In 2005, Phang joined WFOR-TV as a legal consultant to discuss the trial of Michael Jackson. The chief assistant to the state attorney, Katherine Fernandez Rundle, informed her that she needed to quit the role, because Rundle "does not want her assistants providing public legal analysis or commentary regarding criminal trials". Phang instead quit her job with the state attorney's office, keeping the unpaid legal consultant role and joining a private law firm. She also covered the trial of Robert Blake and the Terri Schiavo case for WFOR. She became a legal analyst for Fox News, and was a frequent guest of Greta Van Susteren.

Phang became a legal analyst for NBCUniversal in 2017. In 2021, Phang appeared with Kevin O'Leary and Ada Pozo on CNBC's Money Court, where they adjudicated financial disputes. In April 2022, she debuted her own show on MSNBC and Peacock, The Katie Phang Show, which airs on weekends on MSNBC and Thursdays to Fridays on Peacock. Phang also hosts 'Class Action', a 12-part documentary podcast following competitive mock trial teams. Phang is also a fill in host on MSNBC's All In with Chris Hayes and The Beat with Ari Melber.

Personal life
Phang and her husband, Jonathan Feldman, live in Miami Shores. They have a daughter.

References

1975 births
Living people
American people of South Korean descent
American political commentators
American women podcasters
Lawyers from Miami
MSNBC people
People from Miami Shores, Florida
University of Miami School of Law alumni
Yale University alumni